Polar distance may refer to:

 Polar distance (astronomy), an astronomical term associated with the celestial equatorial coordinate system Σ(α, δ)ellipse and lower, a hyperbola
 Polar distance (geometry), more correctly called radial distance, typically denoted r, a coordinate in polar coordinate systems (r, θ)
 Polar distance (botany) is used in the classification of pollens
 Polar distance (geodesy), the length of the meridian quadrant from the equator to the pole